Elections to Cumnock and Doon Valley District Council were held on 1 May 1980, on the same day as the other Scottish local government elections. This was the third election to the district council following the local government reforms in the 1970s.

The election was the last to use the original 10 wards created by the Formation Electoral Arrangements in 1974. Each ward elected one councillor using first-past-the-post voting. Following the Initial Statutory Reviews of Electoral Arrangements in 1981, several wards were changed or abolished.

Labour maintained control of the district council after winning eight of the 10 seats as the party increased their vote share by more than 8% and took nearly half of the popular vote. The other two seats were won by independent candidates. Both the nationalist Scottish Labour Party (SLP) and unionist Conservatives lost all of their seats. For the SLP, which had won two seats in the prior district election, one of their councillors in Patna and Dalrymple resigned the party whip and instead contested the election as an independent while the other councillor, in Old Cumnock Parish, lost to the Labour candidate. The former Conservative seat of Catrine and Sorn was also won by Labour.

Results

Source:

Ward results

Cumnock Burgh

Lugar, Logan and Muirkirk

Old Cumnock Parish

Auchinleck

Catrine and Sorn

New Cumnock

Dalmellington

Patna and Dalrymple

Drongan, Ochiltree, Rankinston and Stair

Mauchline

References

1980 Scottish local elections
1980